Jamides caerulea, the royal cerulean, is a small butterfly that belongs to the lycaenids or blues family. It was described by Herbert Druce in 1873. It is found in the Indomalayan realm.

Subspecies
Jamides caerulea caerulea (Burma to Singapore, Sumatra, Borneo)
Jamides caerulea metallica (Fruhstorfer, 1916) (Java)
Jamides caerulea selvagia (Fruhstorfer, 1915) (Simalue)

See also
List of butterflies of India
List of butterflies of India (Lycaenidae)

References

 
 
 
 
 
 

Jamides
Butterflies described in 1873
Butterflies of Asia
Taxa named by Herbert Druce